

Definition 

Indigenous communities, peoples, and nations are those which have a historical continuity with pre-invasion and pre-colonial societies that developed on their territories, and may consider themselves distinct from other sectors of the societies now prevailing on those territories, or parts of them. They form at present non-dominant sectors of society and are determined to preserve, develop and transmit to future generations their ancestral territories, and their ethnic identity, as the basis of their continued existence as peoples, in accordance with their own cultural patterns, social institutions and legal system.

This historical continuity may consist of the continuation, for an extended period reaching into the present of one or more of the following factors:
 Occupation of ancestral lands, or at least of part of them
 Common ancestry with the original occupants of these lands
 Culture in general, or in specific manifestations (such as religion, living under a tribal system, membership in an Indigenous community, dress, means of livelihood, lifestyle, etc.)
 Language (whether used as the only language, as mother-tongue, as the habitual means of communication at home or in the family, or as the main, preferred, habitual, general or normal language)
 Residence in certain parts of the country, or in certain regions of the world
 Other relevant factors.
 On an individual basis, an Indigenous person is one who belongs to these Indigenous populations through self-identification as Indigenous (group consciousness) and is recognized and accepted by these populations as one of its members (acceptance by the group). This preserves for these communities the sovereign right and power to decide who belongs to them, without external interference.

Africa

African Great Lakes 

Abagusii: Kenya
Hadza (Hadzabe): Tanzania, Singida region: southeast, south and northwest of Lake Eyashi.
Iraqw: Tanzania
Kalenjin: Kenya
Kikuyu: Kenya
Luhya: Kenya
Maasai: Kenya, Tanzania
Rendille: Kenya
Samburu: Kenya, Tanzania
Sandawe: Tanzania, Dodoma region: Kondoa district, between Bubu and Mponde rivers, Singida region.
Pygmy peoples:
Twa
Bangweulu Twa: Northern Zambia, Bangweulu Swamps,
Great Lakes Twa: Rwanda, Burundi, Uganda, Democratic Republic of Congo
Kafwe Twa: Southern Zambia, Kafue Flats
Lukanga Twa: Central Zambia, Lukanga Swamp
Nsua: Western Uganda

Central Africa 

Pygmy peoples:
Bedzan: Northern Central Cameroon
Mbenga:
Aka (Bayaka)
Baka (Bebayaka): Cameroon, Congo (Brazzaville), Gabon, and Central African Republic
Bongo (Babongo):
Gyele (Bagyele):
Kola (Bakola):
Mbuti (Bambuti):
Asua: Democratic Republic of the Congo
Efé: Democratic Republic of the Congo
Kango/Sua:
Mbuti:
Wochua:
Twa
Angola Twa: Northeastern, Eastern and Southern Angola
Kasai Twa (Kuba Twa): Central Democratic Republic of Congo
Mbote Twa: Southeastern Democratic Republic of Congo, Northwest of Lake Tanganyika
Mongo Twa (Ntomba Twa): Western Democratic Republic of Congo, Lake Tumba, Lake Mai-Ndombe
Upemba Twa (Luba Twa): Southeastern Democratic Republic of Congo, Upemba Depression

Horn of Africa 
Afar people (Qafár/'Afár): the Afar Triangle of Djibouti, Eritrea, Ethiopia
Amhara: Ethiopia
Banna: Southwestern Ethiopia, Southern Nations, Nationalities, and Peoples Region (SNNPR)
Basketo: Southwestern Ethiopia, Southern Nations, Nationalities, and Peoples Region (SNNPR)
Berta (Funj): Western Ethiopia, Benishangul-Gumuz Region, Far Eastern Sudan
Burji: Southern Ethiopia, Southern Nations, Nationalities, and Peoples Region (SNNPR)
Gedeo: Southern Ethiopia, Southern Nations, Nationalities, and Peoples Region (SNNPR)
Gumuz: Western Ethiopia, Benishangul-Gumuz Region, Far Eastern Sudan
Hamer: Southwestern Ethiopia, Southern Nations, Nationalities, and Peoples Region (SNNPR)
Karo: Southwestern Ethiopia, Southern Nations, Nationalities, and Peoples Region (SNNPR)
Kunama: Western Eritrea, Gash-Barka Region, Far Eastern Sudan
Maale: Southwestern Ethiopia, Southern Nations, Nationalities, and Peoples Region (SNNPR)
Mursi (Mun): mainly in Debub Omo Zone, Southern Nations, Nationalities and Peoples Region, Southwest Ethiopia
Nara: Western Eritrea, Gash-Barka Region, Far Eastern Sudan
Oromo people: Ethiopia, Kenya
Saho: Central Eritrea, Southern part of Northern Red Sea Region
Shinasha (Shinasha): Northwestern Ethiopia
Sidama: Southern Ethiopia, Southern Nations, Nationalities, and Peoples Region (SNNPR)
Somalis: Somalia, Djibouti, eastern Ethiopia, northeastern Kenya
Suri Baale: Ethiopia
Suri Chai: Ethiopia
Suri Timaga: Ethiopia
Wolayta: Southwestern Ethiopia, Southern Nations, Nationalities, and Peoples Region (SNNPR)
Yem: Southwestern Ethiopia, Southern Nations, Nationalities, and Peoples Region (SNNPR)

North Africa 

Afroasiatic languages
Berbers (Imazighen): Morocco, Tunisia, Algeria, Libya, Egypt, Mauritania, Mediterranean Coast, Atlas Mountains (Idurar n Waṭlas), North and Western Sahara
Eastern Berbers
Nafusa people: Nafusa Mountains (Drar n infusen), Tripolitania, northwestern Libya
Zuwara Berbers: Zuwara, coast of western Tripolitania in northwestern Libya.
Matmata Berbers: Matmâta, southern Tunisia
Djerba Berbers: Djerba Island, southern Tunisia coast
Sokna Berbers: Sokna Oasis (Isuknan), Fezzan, north central Libya, Sahara
Awjila: Awjila oasis, Cyrenaica, eastern Libya, Sahara
Ghadamès: Ghadamès Oasis, Western Libya, Sahara
Northern Berbers
Kabyles (Iqvayliyen): Kabylie (Tamurt n Iqvayliyen), Mediterranean coast of northern Algeria
Zenati (Iznaten/Iznasen) speakers: regions in Algeria and Morocco
Mozabites (At Mzab): Mzab region, northern Sahara, north central Algeria
Shawiya (Išawiyen): Aurès Mountains (Idurar n Awras), northeastern Algeria
Shenwa (Ichenwiyen): west-central mountains of northwestern Algeria
Riffians (Irifiyen): Rif, Rif Mountains (Arrif), northern Morocco
Sanhaja (Iẓnagen/Iẓnajen) peoples: regions in Middle West Atlas mountains and Eastern Morocco
Masmuda peoples: regions in Northern and Western Morocco
Ghomara: Far West Rif Mountains (Arrif), Northern Morocco
Shilha (Shlḥi): West Atlas mountains, Western Morocco
Haratin: Indigenous population of the Maghreb and Sahara of uncertain origin; members now speak either Berber languages or Arabic; inhabit Morocco, Mauritania, Western Sahara, Algeria.
Serer - current habit Senega, Gambia, Mauritania
Toubou: Chad

Nile Valley

Egypt
Copts (Rem en Khēmi/Rem en Kēme): Egypt, the majority of Egypt's population descended from Ancient Egyptians
Beja: Northeastern Sudan, between Red Sea coast and almost to the Nile River (White Nile and Blue Nile) eastern banks, Far Northwest Eritrea, Sahara Eastern Desert, Far Southeast Egypt 
Siwi Berbers: Siwa Oasis (Isiwan), western Egypt, Sahara

Sudan
Nuba peoples: Sudan, Nuba Hills

Nubians: Far Northern North Sudan and Far Southern Egypt, along middle Nile river valley banks 
Dinka (Jieng): mainly in Lakes, Warrap and Unity States, Upper Nile river course, Central and North South Sudan.
Nuer (Naadh): mainly in Jonglei State, East of Upper Nile river course, East Central South Sudan.
Anuak (Anywaa): mainly East Jonglei State, East South Sudan, and also mainly in Gambela Region, Lowlands of Far Southwest Ethiopia (border areas between South Sudan and Ethiopia).
Shilluk (Chollo/Cøllø): mainly in North South Sudan, west of the Upper Nile river course, Upper Nile State, South Sudan (Kodok or Kothok, formerly known as Fashoda is in their territory).
Fur (Fòòrà): Darfur, Western Sudan
Masalit: Darfur, Western Sudan
Kadu peoples: Sudan, Nuba Hills

Southern Africa 

Southern Khoikhoi languages speaking peoples: Angola, Namibia, Botswana, Kalahari desert, Zimbabwe, west and southwestern South Africa.
Khoikhoi
Nama (Namaqua)
Damara 

Haiǁom
Gǀu and Gǁana
Naro
Tsoa/Tshwa/Kua
Southern San languages speaking peoples: Angola, Namibia, Botswana, Kalahari desert, west and southwestern South Africa.
Kx'a/Ju–ǂHoan
ǃKung/Juu
ǂʼAmkoe
ǂKxʼao-ǁʼae (Auen)
Tuu
ǃKwi (!Ui)
ǀXam
ǂKhomani (Nǀu)
Khwe (Khoi, Kxoe)
Taa
ǃXooŋake/Nǀumde

Eurasia

Asia

West Asia (Middle East) 

Afroasiatic languages
Semitic peoples
East Semitic peoples
Assyrians (Āṯūrāyē/Sūrāyē/Sūryāyē): A Christian Neo-Aramaic speaking people indigenous to Assyria, which is located in what is now northern Iraq, southeastern Turkey, northeastern Syria and northwestern Iran in Upper Mesopotamia. There is a testified historical continuity between ancient Assyrians and modern Assyrians, for the majority of Assyrians in the same land that they have lived in since antiquity: (Assyria, Athura, Roman Assyria, & Asoristan), before the Arabization of Upper Mesopotamia, that corresponds with old Assyria (originally speakers of the Akkadian language but in antiquity, by the end of the 1st millennium BC, Assyrians adopted the Aramaic language from Aramaeans as an official language of the Assyrian Empire and in present times speak Assyrian Neo-Aramaic. However, not all Assyrians identify as Assyrian, and several are from peoples that adopted an Assyrian ethnic identity (see terms for Syriac Christians).
West Semitic peoples
Central Semitic peoples
Arabic peoples
Bedouin (Badawī) of the interior deserts of Arabia and Syria.
Druze (Al-Muwaḥḥidūn/Al-Muwaḥḥidīn/Ahl al-Tawḥīd): of Jabal al-Druze, Syria, Lebanon, Jordan and Israel. The faith of the Druze is a blend of Islam's Ismailism, Judaism, Christianity, Neoplatonism, Pythagoreanism, Gnosticism and Greek philosophy. The foundational text of the faith is the Epistles of Wisdom. Even though they have been a minority for their entire history, they have played a significant role in shaping the history of the Levant. Although the faith originally developed out of Ismaili Islam, Druze are usually not considered Muslims. The oldest and most densely-populated Druze communities exist in Mount Lebanon and in the south of Syria around Jabal al-Druze (literally the "Mountain of the Druze").
Mandaeans
Marsh Dwellers/Marsh Arabs (Ma'dan/ʻArab al-Ahwār): An Arabic-speaking people living in the marshes of southern Iraq or on the Iranian side of the Shatt al-Arab.
Northwest Semitic peoples
Arameans (Āramayē): Central and Western Syria, ancient land of the Aramaeans (Aram) in the Levant, an Aramaic-speaking people that descends from ancient Aramaeans. In recent years, there has been an attempt to revive Western Aramaic among Aramean Christians living in the Israeli village of Jish.
Canaanite peoples
Jews: along with Samaritans, descend from the Israelite nation of the southern Levant, who are believed by archaeologists and historians to have branched out of the Canaanite peoples and culture through the development of a distinct monolatrous—and later monotheistic—religion centered on El/Yahweh, one of the Ancient Canaanite deities. A Jewish diaspora existed for several centuries before the fall of the Second Temple, and their dwelling in other countries for the most part  was not a result of compulsory dislocation. Following the Roman Siege of Jerusalem, destruction of Herod's Temple, and failed Jewish revolts, some Jews were either expelled, taken as slaves to Rome, or massacred, while other Jews continued to live in the region over the centuries, despite the conversion of many Jews to Christianity and Islam as well as persecution by the various conquerors of the region, including the Romans, Arabs, Ottomans, and the British. Additionally, a substantial number of diaspora Jews immigrated to Palestine during the 19th and 20th centuries (mainly under the Zionist movement), as well as after the modern State of Israel was established in 1948. This was coupled with the revival of Hebrew, the only Canaanite language still spoken today. DNA studies show that many major diaspora Jewish communities derive a substantial portion of their ancestry from ancient Israelites.

There are competing claims that Palestinian Arabs and Jews are indigenous to historic Palestine/the Land of Israel. The argument entered the Israeli–Palestinian conflict in the 1990s, with Palestinians claiming Indigenous status as a pre-existing population displaced by Jewish settlement, and currently constituting a minority in the State of Israel. Israeli Jews have in turn claimed indigeneity based on historic ties to the region and disputed the authenticity of Palestinian claims. In 2007, the Negev Bedouin were officially recognised as Indigenous peoples of Israel by the United Nations. This has been criticised both by scholars associated with the Israeli state, who dispute the Bedouin's claim to indigeneity, and those who argue that recognising just one group of Palestinians as Indigenous risks undermining others' claims and "fetishising" nomadic cultures.

Samaritans (Samerim): of Samaria. An ethno-religious group of the Levant, closely related genetically and culturally to the Jewish diaspora and are understood to have branched off from the latter around the time of the Assyrian exile. The Samaritans are adherents of Samaritanism, an Abrahamic religion closely related to Judaism. Their sole norm of religious observance is the Samaritan Pentateuch.

Bathari people: Dhofar, Southern Oman. Descendants from the original people of Dhofar before Arabization.
Harasis: Jiddat al-Harasis, Central Oman. Descendants from the original people of South Arabia before Arabization.
Hobyót people: Dhofar, Southern Oman, Far Eastern Yemen. Descendants from the original people of Dhofar before Arabization.
Mehris: Al Mahrah, Eastern Yemen, Dhofar, Southern Oman. Descendants from the original people of Dhofar before Arabization.
Shehri people/Jibbali people: Dhofar, Southern Oman. Descendants from the original people of Dhofar before Arabization.
Soqotri people: Soqotra island and group of islands, southeast of mainland Yemen, Indian Ocean. Descendants from the original natives of South Arabia before Arabization.

Armenians (Hayer): The Christian Armenian people were the original inhabitants of what is now modern Eastern Turkey, specifically around Lake Van and the biblical mountain of Ararat and spoke the Western Armenian language. Since the Armenian genocide in which up to 1,500,000 people perished, the number of the original Armenian inhabitants is almost non-existent and they have since been replaced with ethnic Turks and Kurds.
Iranian peoples
East Iranian peoples
Northeast Iranian peoples
Ossetians (Iræттæ): South Ossetia, Georgia, Southern Caucasus Mountains
West Iranian peoples
Caspian/South Caspian peoples
Gilaks: Gilan, North Iran, South Caspian Sea coast and Elburz Mountains
Mazanderanis/Mazanis/Tabaris: Mazanderan, Tabaristan, Northern Iran, South Caspian Sea coast and Elburz Mountains
Northwest Iranian peoples
Northwestern I
Kurds (Kurd/Kurmandzh): Kurdistan, Northwestern and Western Iran, Northern Iraq, Northeast and Northern Syria, Southeast Turkey, Zagros and East Anatolian Plateau
Yazidis (Êzidî): Nineveh Governorate, Northern Iraq
Lak people (Iran): Southwestern Iran, Zagros Mountains
Zaza-Gorani peoples 
Shabaks: Sinjar District of the Nineveh Governorate in northern Iraq.
Zazas: Southeastern Turkey, Upper Euphrates river, East Anatolian Plateau
Northwestern II
Baluchis (Baloch/Baluch): Baluchistan, Southeastern Iran, Southwestern Pakistan, Extreme Southern Afghanistan
Tatic peoples
Talysh (Talyshon): Northwestern Iran, Far South Azerbaijan, South Caspian Sea coast and Elburz Mountains
Tats (Iran)/South Tats (Irünə Tâtün): Northwest Iran
Southwest Iranian peoples
Persian: Iran, Afghanistan, Tajikistan, Uzbekistan
Larestani–Gulf peoples
Kumzaris: Northern Musandam, Oman
Lurs and Bakhtiaris
Lurs (Lur): Luristan, Western and Southwestern Iran, Zagros Mountains
Bakhtiaris (Bakhtiar): Southwestern Iran, Zagros
Tats (Caucasus): Republic of Azerbaijan, Dagestan (Russia)

Caucasus 

Indo-European peoples
Armenians (Hayer): 
Iranian peoples
East Iranian peoples
Northeast Iranian peoples
Ossetians (Iræттæ): Ossetia (Iryston), North Ossetia (Cægat Iryston), a Republic of Russia, and South Ossetia (Khussar Iryston), a De Jure autonomous region of Georgia (Sakartvelo), self-proclaimed sovereign country, North and South slopes of Central Caucasus Mountains.
West Iranian peoples
Southwest Iranian peoples
Persian peoples
Tats (Caucasus) (Tati/Parsi/Lohijon/Daghli): East Caucasus Mountains, Azerbaijan
Kartvelian peoples
Zan
Lazs (Lazepe): Southwestern Georgia, Far Northeastern Turkey
Northeast Caucasian peoples
Avar-Andic peoples
Avar people (Caucasus) (Magharulal/Avaral): Dagestan, European Russia, Northern Caucasus Mountains
Andic peoples
Akhvakh (Ashvado/Atluatii)
Andis (Qhvannal/Khivannal)
Bagvalal (Bagval)
Botlikhs (Buykhal'ida/Buykhalyi)
Chamalals (Chamalaldu)
Godoberis (Giybdiridi)
Karatas (Khkhiridi)
Tindis (Idarab)
Dargins (Darganti): Dagestan, European Russia, Northern Caucasus Mountains
Khinalug (Kettiturdur/Kayttiodur/Ketid/Ketsh Khalkh)
Lak people (Dagestan): Dagestan, European Russia, Northern Caucasus Mountains
Lezgic peoples
Aghul (Agular): Dagestan, European Russia, Northern Caucasus Mountains
Archins (Arshishttib)
Budukh (Budad)
Jeks (Cekad/Dzhekad)
Kryts (Kh'rytsha'/Kyrtuar)
Lezgians (Lezgiyar/Leqer): Dagestan, European Russia, Northern Caucasus Mountains
Rutul (Mykhabyr): Dagestan, European Russia, Northern Caucasus Mountains
Tabasarans: Dagestan, European Russia, Northern Caucasus Mountains
Tsakhur (Yiqby): Azerbaijan, Southern Caucasus Mountains
Udins (Udi/Uti): Northern Azerbaijan, Southern Caucasus Mountains
Nakh peoples
Bats (Batsbi)
Vainakh peoples
Chechens (Nokhchiy): Chechenia, European Russia, Northern Caucasus Mountains
Ingush (Ghalghay): Ingushetia, European Russia, Northern Caucasus Mountains
Tsezic (Didoic) peoples
Bezhtas
Hinukh (Hinuqes)
Hunzibs (Hunzib)
Khwarshi (Khuani)
Tsez/Dido people
Northwest Caucasian peoples
Abkhaz-Abaza peoples
Abazins (Abaza)
Abkhazians (Aphsua): Abkhazia (Aphsny) - a De Jure autonomous region of Georgia (Sakartvelo), self-proclaimed sovereign country.
Circassian peoples
West Circassian peoples
Adyghe (Adyge): Adyghe Republic, European Russia, Northern Caucasus Mountains
East Circassian peoples
Cherkess (Cherkes): Karachay-Cherkessia, European Russia, Northern Caucasus Mountains
Kabardians (Qeberdeykher): Kabardino-Balkaria, European Russia, Northern Caucasus Mountains
Karachays (Karachai): Karachay-Cherkessia, North Caucasian peoples, Northern Caucasus Mountains
Ubykh (Tʷaχ): were indigenous to the mountains of West Caucasus, Sochi area, Krasnodar Krai, Russia, later migrated to Turkey.

Siberia (North Asia) 

  

Over 40 distinct peoples, each with their own language and culture in the Asiatic part of Russia (Siberia/North Asia).
Chukchi-Kamchatkan peoples
Chukotkan peoples
Chukchi (Lyg'oravetl'et/Chukchi people|O'ravetl'et/Ankalyn-Chavchu): Northeast Siberia, Russia
Koryaks (Nymylan-Chauchuven): Russian Far East
Alyutors: Russian Far East
Kereks: Russian Far East
Kamchatkan peoples
Itelmens: Kamchatka Krai
Eskimo-Aleut peoples
Yupik: Alaska and the Russian Far East
Siberian Yupik (Yupighyt): Siberia, Russia, Alaska, United States.
Sirenik Eskimos, Russian Far East.
Naukan, Russian Far East.
Mongolic peoples
Buryats (Buryaad): Buryatia, Russia, and Mongolia
Hamnigans: Zabaykalsky Krai, Russia, Mongolia, and China
Tungusic peoples
Northern Tungusic peoples
Evenks (Evenkil): Siberia (They are also distributed in China and Mongolia in East Asia).
Udege (Udihe/Udekhe/Udeghe): Russian Far East, Ukraine
Turkic peoples
Siberian Turks
Altaians (Altay-kizhi): titular nation of Altai Republic, Russia
Chelkans
Telengits
Tubalars
Chulyms: Tomsk Oblast, Russia
Dolgans: Northern Siberia 
Khakas (Tadarlar): titular nation of Khakassia, Russia
Kumandins: Altai Krai, Russia
Shors: Southern Siberia
Soyots: Buryatia, Russia
Teleuts: Kemerovo Oblast, Russia
Tofalars: Southern Siberia 
Tuvans (Tyvalar): titular nation of Tuva Republic, Russia
Tozhu Tuvans: Tuva Republic, Russia
Yakuts (Sakha): titular nation of Yakutia, Russia
Kipchak Turks
Siberian Tatars
Baraba Tatars
Ugric peoples
Ugrians: Yugra, Western Siberia, Russia
Khanty (Hantõ-Kantõk/Kantek/Khanti): Yugra, Western Siberia, Russia
Mansi (Maan's'i/Maan's'i Maahum/Mansi), formerly known as Voguls: Yugra, Western Siberia, Russia
Samoyedic peoples
Northern Samoyedic peoples: West Siberia and Far Northern European Russia
Enets (Entsi): Far Northern Western Siberia, Russia
Nenets (Neney Neneche): Far Northern Western Siberia and Far Northern European Russia
Nganasan (Ŋənəhsa(nəh)): Taymyr Peninsula, Siberia, Russia
Yukaghirs (Odul/Vadul/Detkil'): Far Northern East Siberia, Russia
Yeniseian peoples
Ket (Deng): Along middle Yenisei river banks
Nivkh (Gilyak): Sakhalin, Russia
Oroks (Uilta): Sakhalin, Russia

Eurasian Steppe 

Indo-European peoples
Iranian peoples
East Iranian peoples
Northeast Iranian peoples
Pamiris (Pomir): Badakhshan (Afghanistan, Tajikistan), Pamir Mountains, Tashkurgan (in Xinjiang)
Tajiks: Tajikistan
Yaghnobi (Yaγnōbī́t): Tajikistan
Mongolic peoples
Central Mongolic peoples
Khoid: Mongolia
Mangud: Historically Mongolia
Mongols: Mongolia, China
Naimans (Nayman): Inner Mongolia, China
Oirats (Oirad/Oird) (Dzungars and Torghuts): Dzungaria (Northern Xinjiang), China
Sartuul: Zavkhan, Mongolia
Sino-Tibetan-speaking peoples
Tibetans: Tibet, China and neighbouring regions
Turkic peoples
Common Turks
Karluk Turks (Southeastern Common Turkic peoples)
Uyghurs (Uyghur): Tarim Basin (Southern Xinjiang), China
Ili Turks: Ili Kazakh Autonomous Prefecture, Northern Xinjiang, China
Yugur (Yogïr/Sarïg Yogïr): Sunan Yugur Autonomous County, Gansu province, China
Salar (Salır): Xunhua Salar Autonomous County, Qinghai province, China
Dukha (Dukha/Dukhans/Duhalar/Tsaatan): Mongolia
Uriankhai (Wūliánghǎi/Uriankhan/урианхан/Uriankhat/урианхад): Mongolia
Kipchak Turks (Northwestern Common Turkic peoples)
Bashkirs (Başqorttar): Bashkir Republic, European Russia
Kazakhs: Kazakhstan, China, Mongolia, Russia
Kyrgyzs: Kyrgyzstan, China
Krymchaks (Qrymçaklar): Crimean Peninsula in Southern Ukraine
Crimean Karaites (Qrymqaraylar): Crimean Peninsula in Southern Ukraine
Crimean Tatars (Qırımtatarlar): Crimean Peninsula in Southern Ukraine
Volga Tatars (Tatarlar): Tatarstan, European Russia
Oghuz Turks (Southwestern Common Turkic peoples)
Gagauz (Gagauzlar): Gagauzia, Moldova
Oghur (tribe)
Chuvash (Chăvаsh): Chuvash Republic, Russia

South Asia 

Adivasis: collective term for many Indigenous peoples in India (see also Scheduled Tribes in India)
Dravidian peoples
Badaga: Tamil Nadu, South India
Gond: Gondwana Land, Central India
Irula: Tamil Nadu, South India
Kisan: Indigenous peoples of the Odisha, East India
Kodava: Kodagu, Karnataka, South India
Kota (Kothar/Kov): Tamil Nadu, South India
Kuruba: Andhra Pradesh, Karnataka, Tamil Nadu, South India
Tamil: Tamil Nadu, South India and Sri Lanka
Toda: Tamil Nadu, South India
South Dravidian peoples
Giraavaru: Maldives
Indo-European peoples
Iranian peoples
Pashtuns: southern Afghanistan and Northwest Pakistan
Baloch: southeastern Iran and southwest Pakistan
Indo-Aryan peoples
Dard: Dardistan, Khyber-Pakhtunkhwa, Gilgit-Baltistan, Northern Pakistan
Kalasha of Chitral (Kaĺaśa): Ancient pre-Muslim polytheistic pagan ethnic minority in Chitral District, Northern Pakistan
Shina: Gilgit-Baltistan, Northern Pakistan
Kashmiri Hindus: India
Sindhi: Sindh, Pakistan, India
Bengali: Bangladesh, India
Gujarati: India 
Banjara: Rajasthan
Bhil people: Gujarat, Rajasthan, Madhya Pradesh
Jaunsari people: Uttarakhand
Dogras: Jammu
Tharu: Nepal, East India
Warli
Sino-Tibetan-speaking peoples
Bodish peoples
Ladakhi: Ladakh, North India
Konyak peoples
Indigenous Assamese people
Tripuri (Borok): Tripura, North-East India
Konyak peoples
Nocte: Tirap, Arunachal Pradesh, North-East India
Kukish peoples
Karbi: Karbi Anglong, Assam, North-East-India
Mizo (Mizo hnam): Mizoram, North-East India
Naga: Nagaland, North-East India
Raji-Raute peoples
Raute: Nepal, North India
Digaro peoples
Mishmi: Arunachal Pradesh, North-East India
Jumma people (a collective term for several peoples)
Chakma: Bangladesh, Arunachal Pradesh - North-East India
Indigenous peoples of Sikkim: India
Sino-Tibetan-speaking peoples
Bodish peoples
Bhutia (Denzongpa)
Lepcha (Róng ʔágít/Róngkup/Mútuncí Róngkup Rumkup)
Meitei: Manipur, North-East India
Burusho: Hunza and Chitral districts, Gilgit-Baltistan, Northern Pakistan
Sino-Tibetan-speaking peoples
Lolo-Burmese peoples
Burmish peoples
Marma: Bangladesh
Meitei people: Manipur and neighboring states of India, Bangladesh, Myanmar
Vedda (Wanniyala-Aetto): Sri Lanka
Sinhalese: Sri Lanka
Dhivehi: Maldives

Southeast Asia

Mainland Southeast Asia (Indochinese Peninsula) 

Austroasiatic peoples
Aslian peoples
Senoi (Sengoi/Sng'oi) (a people of the ethnic groups called by the generic word Orang Asli - Original People): in Peninsular Malaysia)
Khmer Krom: of Vietnam
Khmuic groups:
Khmu (Kmm̥uʔ/Kmmúʔ): Thailand and Laos
Mlabri: Northern Thailand and Laos
Pray: Thailand and Laos
Palaungic peoples
Wa (Vāx): One of the hill tribes of Myanmar (They are also distributed in Yunnan Province, China in East Asia).
Zomi (Zo Pau): One of the Indigenous peoples in Southeast Asia. The word Zomi is the collective name given to many tribes who traced their descent from a common ancestor. Through history they have been known under various appellation, such as Chin, Kuki and Mizo, but the expression was disliked by them, and they insist that the term was a misnomer given by others and by which they have been recorded in certain documents designate their ancient origins as a separate ethnicity.
Vietic peoples
Muong
Tho
Tuom
Liha
Phong
Thavueng
Ahoe (Phon Sung)
Ahao
Ahlao
Chuet
Rục
Mày
Arem
Mã Liềng
Sách
Salang
Maleng–Pakatan
Bo
Arao
Atel
Atop
Kaleun
Maleng
Pakatan
Themarou
Kri–Phoóng
Krii
Phoóng
Mlengbrou
Austronesian peoples
Malayo-Polynesian peoples
Chamic peoples
Cham (Chams/Urang Campa): of Vietnam and Cambodia
Proto-Malay (a people of the ethnic groups called by the generic word Orang Asli - Original People): in Peninsular Malaysia
Moken: in Myanmar, and Thailand
Hmong-Mien peoples
Hmong: subgroups of Thailand, Myanmar, Laos and Vietnam (They are also distributed in China in East Asia). 
Montagnards (Degar): an umbrella term for several Pre-Vietnamese peoples that dwell in the plateaus and mountains of the southern regions of Vietnam
Austroasiatic peoples
Bahnaric peoples
North Bahnaric peoples
Sedang, Halang and Kayong: Vietnam
H're people: Quảng Ngãi Province, Central Vietnam
Central Bahnaric peoples
Bahnar: Central Highland provinces of Gia Lai and Kon Tum, as well as the coastal provinces of Bình Định and Phú Yên (Vietnam)
Jeh-Tariang people: Kon Tum, Vietnam
Southern Bahnaric peoples
Mạ people: Central Highlands, Vietnam
Mnong: Cambodia and Vietnam
Stieng: Cambodia and Vietnam
Koho: Di Linh Highland of Vietnam 
Eastern Bahnaric:
Cor people 
Katuic peoples
Katu
Katu: Vietnam and Laos
West
Bru (Bruu): Thailand, Laos, India and Vietnam
Ta Oi people: Laos, Vietnam
Austronesian peoples
Malayo-Polynesian peoples
Chamic peoples
Highlands Chamic peoples
Rade-Jarai
Jarai: Central Highlands of Vietnam, as well as in the Northeast Province of Ratanakiri (Cambodia)
Rhade: Southern Vietnam
Chru–Northern
Northern Cham
Raglai: in Khánh Hòa Province of South Central Coast, and Ninh Thuận Province in the Southeast region of Vietnam
Negrito:
Mani (Maniq): Far Southern Thailand
Semang (a group of several peoples of the ethnic groups called by the generic word Orang Asli - Original People): Peninsular Malaysia
Batek: Peninsular Malaysia
Sino-Tibetan-speaking peoples
Karenic peoples
Karen (Per Ploan Poe/Ploan/Pwa Ka Nyaw/Kanyaw): an alliance of hill tribes of Myanmar and Thailand
Lolo-Burmese peoples
Akha a.k.a. Aini or Aini-Akha: One of the hill tribes of Thailand, Laos and Burma (They are also distributed in Yunnan Province, China in East Asia).
Lahu (Ladhulsi/Kawzhawd): One of the hill tribes of Thailand, Myanmar and Laos (They are also distributed in Yunnan, China).
Lisu: One of the hill tribes of Myanmar and Thailand (They are also distributed in Arunachal Pradesh, India in South Asia and Yunnan and Sichuan, China).
Rakhine (Rəkhàin lùmjó), Kaman and Marma: Arakan in Myanmar
Yi (Nuosu/Nisu/Sani/Axi/Lolo): a group of several related peoples mainly in Yunnan, China.
Tibeto-Burman peoples
Intha: Inle Lake of Myanmar
Tai peoples: Vietnam, Myanmar, Laos and Thailand (They are also distributed in Yunnan, China).
Southwestern Tai peoples
Khün (Thai Khün)
Phu Thai 
Tai Dam: Northwest Vietnam, Laos and Thailand (They are also distributed in Yunnan)
Tai Lu: Laos, Northern Thailand, Myanmar, and Lai Châu Province in Vietnam (They are also distributed in Xishuangbanna in Yunnan, China).
Tai Nüa

Maritime Southeast Asia (Malay Archipelago) 

Austroasiatic peoples
Nicobarese people (Holchu): Nicobar Islands, India
Shompen people (Kalay-Keyet): Nicobar Islands, India
Austronesian peoples
Malayo-Polynesian peoples
Barito peoples
Bajau (Sama/Samah/Samal): Borneo and the Sulu Archipelago (Malaysia, Indonesia, Philippines)
Dayak: Borneo, (Malaysia and Indonesia)
Northwest Sumatra–Barrier Islands peoples
Mentawai peoples
Mentawai: Mentawai Islands, Indonesia
Sakuddei: Siberut Island and Mentawai Islands, Indonesia
Malayic peoples
Orang Laut and Orang Seletar: Malaysia and Singapore
Proto-Malay (Melayu asli/Melayu purba): Malaysia
North Bornean peoples
Penan: Sarawak, Malaysia
Lun Bawang: Sarawak, Malaysia
Philippine peoples
Igorot (Ifugao: Ipugao; Benguet: Ibaloi, Kankanaey; Mountain Province: Bontoc; Kalinga: Kiangan; Abra: Itneg; Apayao: Isneg): Cordillera mountains in Luzon in the Philippines
Lumad (Katawhang Lumad): Mindanao in the Philippines
Mangyan: Mindoro in the Philippines
Moro: Mindanao and Sulu archipelago in the Philippines
Tausug (Tausūg/Suluk/Sulug)
Maguindanao
Maranao (Iranon/Iranun)
Tribes of Palawan: Palawan, Philippines
Orang Rimba (Orang Batin Sembilan/Orang Rimba/Anak Dalam/Kubu): Sumatra, Indonesia
Lubu: Sumatra, Indonesia
Negrito:
Andamanese, in the Andaman Islands, which include:
Great Andamanese: formerly at least 10 distinct groups living throughout Great Andaman, now confined to a single community on Strait Island, Andaman Is.
Jangil (Rutland Jarawa): now extinct, formerly of Rutland Island, Andamans
Jarawa: South Andaman and Middle Andaman
Onge (Önge): Little Andaman, Andaman Islands
Sentinelese (?): North Sentinel Island, Andaman Islands
Aeta: Luzon, Philippines
Ati: Panay, Philippines
Batak: Palawan, Philippines
Pribumi (Native Indonesians): of Indonesia

East Asia

Western China 
Turkic peoples
Äynu peoples
Ili Turk peoples: Ili Kazakh Autonomous Prefecture
Uyghur peoples
Tibetan peoples

North China 
Fuyu Kyrgyz: Fuyu County, Heilongjiang
Hui peoples
Tungusic peoples
Northern Tungusic peoples
Nanai (Hezhen/Nanai/Hezhe/Golds/Samagir): Heilongjiang in China, Khabarovsk Krai and Primorsky Krai in Russia
Oroqen: Far Northern China
Southern Tungusic peoples
Manchu (Manju/Manchu people): Manchuria, northeast China

South China 

Hmong-Mien peoples
Miao: Southern China (provinces of Guizhou, Yunnan, Sichuan, Hubei, Hunan, Guangxi, Guangdong and Hainan), Myanmar, northern Vietnam, Laos and Thailand
Hmong: Southern China, Vietnam and Laos
Yao (Mien): Southern China (provinces Hunan, Guangdong, Guangxi, Guizhou, and Yunnan)

Taiwan 

Indigenous peoples of the island of Taiwan
Amis (Pangcah)
Sakizaya
Bunun
Kavalan (Kebalan; Kbaran)
Atayal (Tayal; Tayan)
Saisiyat (Say-Siyat)
Seediq
Truku (Taroko)
Thao (Ngan)
Paiwan (Payuan)
Puyuma (Pinuyumayan)
Rukai (Drekay)
Tsou (Cou)
Yami (Tao)
Hla'alua (Saaroa)
Kanakanavu

Japan 
Ainu (Aynu): Hokkaido, Japan and (until the end of World War II) on Sakhalin Island, Russia
Japonic peoples
Ryukyuans (Ruuchuu Minzuku): Old Ryūkyū Kingdom, now Japan

Americas 

Americas is the supercontinent comprising North and South America, and associated islands.

List of peoples by geographical and ethnolinguistic grouping:

North America 

North America includes all of the continent and islands east of the Bering Strait and north of the Isthmus of Panama; it includes Greenland, Canada, United States, Mexico, Central American and Caribbean countries. However a distinction can be made between a broader North America and a narrower Northern America and Middle America due to ethnic and cultural characteristics.

Indigenous peoples in North America by Country
Aboriginal peoples in Canada
First Nations
Inuit
Métis
Indigenous peoples in the United States
Alaska Natives
Indigenous peoples of Mexico
Indigenous peoples in North America by native cultural regions

Arctic 

Ancient Beringian - Siberia and Alaska
Eskimo–Aleut
Aleut (Unangax): Aleutian Islands and Kamchatka Krai
Eskimo/Yupit-Inuit
Yupik: Alaska, United States
Alutiiq (Sugpiat): Alaska, United States
Central Alaskan Yup'ik (Yupiat/Yupiit): Alaska, United States
Cup'ik (Cupiit): Alaska, United States
Cup'ig: Nunivak Island, Alaska, United States
Siberian Yupik of St. Lawrence Island, Alaska, United States.
Inuit: Canadian Arctic - Northwest Territories, Nunavik, Nunatsiavut, Nunavut; Greenland; Alaska, United States
Greenlandic Inuit: Greenland
Inughuit: North Greenland
Kalaallit: West Greenland
Tunumiit: East Greenland
Inupiat (Iñupiat): Arctic Alaska, North Slope and boroughs and the Bering Strait
Nunamiut: Interior Alaska.
Inuit: Canadian Arctic
Eastern Canadian Inuit: East Canadian Arctic, East Nunavut, Nunavik, Nunatsiavut
Western Canadian Inuit (Inuvialuit): West Canadian Arctic, Inuvialuit Settlement Region, Arctic coast of Northwest Territories, West Nunavut
Métis: a mixed First Nations (from several peoples) and European (from several peoples) people of Canada.

Subarctic 

Na-Dené peoples
Athabaskan peoples
Northern Athabaskan peoples
Dene of Yukon, British Columbia, Manitoba, Northwest Territory, and Alberta, Canada.
Alaskan Athabaskans
Southern Alaskan peoples
Ahtna
Ingalik
Koyukon of Interior Alaska.
Kutchin of Interior Alaska and the Yukon.
Tanana Athabaskans.
Kolchan of Interior Alaska.
Deg Hit'an of Interior Alaska.
Dena'ina of Interior Alaska.
Holikachuk
Hän of Yukon, Canada, and Alaska, United States.
Métis: a mixed Native American (from several peoples) and European (from several peoples) people of Canada.
Algonquians
Cree of Montana, United States, and Manitoba, Alberta, and Saskatchewan, Canada.
Innu of Northeastern Quebec, and Western Labrador, Canada.
Annishinabe of Quebec, Ontario, and Manitoba, Canada, as well as Kansas, Michigan, Minnesota, Oklahoma, and Wisconsin, United States.
Algonquin of Quebec, and Ontario, Canada.
Beothuk of Newfoundland, Canada.

Pacific Northwest Coast 

Makah of Washington, United States.
Quinault of Washington, United States.
Nootka of British Columbia, Canada.
Kwakiutl of British Columbia, Canada.
Eyak of Alaska, United States.
Haida of British Columbia, Canada, and Alaska, United States.
Tlingit of Alaska, United States.
Tshimshian of British Columbia, Canada, and Alaska, United States.

Northwest Plateau-Great Basin-California

Northwest Plateau

Great Basin 

Ute of Utah, United States.
Shoshone of Colorado, Nevada, and Utah, United States.
Mono of California, United States.
Bannock of Idaho, United States.
Western Shoshone of Nevada, United States.
Timbisha of Nevada, United States.
Washoe of Nevada, United States.
 
Paiute of Colorado, California, Nevada, and Utah, United States.
Northern Paiute.
Southern Paiute.
Pais of Colorado, Arizona, and New Mexico, United States, as well as Baja California, Mexico.
Hualapai of Arizona, United States.
Walapai of Arizona and Colorado, United States.

California 

Yuman-Cochimi peoples
Cochimí people: Baja California, Mexico
Core Yuman peoples
Kiliwa (K'olew): Baja California, Mexico
Paipai (Akwa'ala/Yakakwal): Baja California, Mexico
Delta-Californian peoples
Cocopa (Cocopah/Xawiƚƚ Kwñchawaay): Baja California, Mexico, and Arizona, United States.
Kumeyaay (Ipai-Tipai/MuttTipi): Baja California, Mexico, and California, United States.
Miwok of California, United States.
Maidu of California, United States.
Wintu of California, United States.
Chumash of California, United States.
Tongva of California, United States.
Modoc of California, and Oregon, United States.
Athabaskans
Achumawi of California, and Oregon, United States.
Hupa of California and Oregon, United States.
Cahuilla of California, United States.
Mojave of California, and Nevada, United States.
Uto-Aztecans
Mono of California, and Nevada, United States.
Northern Paiute of California and Nevada, United States.
Ohlone of California, United States.
Karok of California, United States.

Great Plains 

Comanche of Texas and Oklahoma, United States.
Osage of Kansas and Nebraska, United States.
Sioux of North Dakota, South Dakota, and Minnesota, United States, as well as Saskatchewan, and Alberta, Canada.
Lakota of South Dakota, United States.
Dakota people of Minnesota, United States, and Saskatchewan, Canada.
Kiowa of Texas, and Oklahoma.
Plains Apache (see the Southwest section for another category this tribe belongs too) of Texas, and Oklahoma.
Crow of Montana.
Omaha of Nebraska.
Blackfoot of Montana, United States, Alberta, Canada, and Saskatchewan, Canada.

Eastern Woodlands

Northeastern Woodlands 

Iroquoian peoples
Haudenosaunee of New York, Wisconsin, and Oklahoma, United States, as well as Quebec and Ontario, Canada.
Mohawk of Quebec, Canada, and New York, United States.
Seneca of New York, and Oklahoma, United States, as well as Ontario, Canada.
Cayuga of Oklahoma, and New York, United States, as well as Ontario, Canada.
Oneida of Wisconsin and New York, United States, as well as Ontario, Canada.
Tuscarora of New York, United States, and Ontario, Canada.
Onondaga of New York, United States, and Ontario, Canada.
Wyandot of Kansas, Michigan, and Oklahoma, United States, as well as Ontario, Canada.
Nation du chat of Upstate New York, Ohio, and Northwest Pennsylvania, United States.
Conestoga (Susquehannock) of Pennsylvania, West Virginia, New York, and Maryland (United States).
St. Lawrence Iroquoians: St. Lawrence River, Quebec, Canada, and New York, United States.
Monongahela: Pennsylvania, West Virginia, and Ohio, United States.
Nottoway of Virginia, United States.
Westo of Virginia and South Carolina, United States.
Algic peoples
Algonquian peoples
Chowanoke of North Carolina.
Carolina Algonquian
Roanoke of North Carolina.
Croatan of North Carolina.
Powhatan Confederacy of Virginia.
Pamunkey of Virginia, United States.
Powhatan people of Virginia, United States.
Wampanoag of Massachusetts.
Wabanaki of Maine, United States, and New Brunswick and Newfoundland, Canada.
Abenaki of New Hampshire, Maine and Vermont.
Penobscot of Maine.
Miqmac of Maine, New Brunswick, and Newfoundland.
Passamaquoddy of Maine, United States, and New Brunswick, Canada.
Maliseet of New Brunswick and Quebec.
Shawnee of the Ohio River Valley, now Oklahoma.
Central Algonquian peoples
Kikapú (Kiikaapoa/Kiikaapoi): Indigenous peoples from southeast Michigan, United States, also in Coahuila, Mexico.
Peoria (Illiniwek)
Annishinabe
Ojibwe of Minnesota, North Dakota, and Michigan, United States, as well as Ontario, Canada.
Potawatomi of Michigan and Indiana, United States, as well as Ontario, Canada.
Odawa of Oklahoma and Michigan, United States, as well as Ontario, Canada.
Cree of Alberta, Manitoba, Ontario, Saskatchewan, and the Northwest Territories, Canada, as well as Montana, United States.

Southeastern Woodlands 

Cherokee of North Carolina, Georgia, and Oklahoma.
Natchez of Louisiana and Arkansas.
Muskogeans
Muskogee of Georgia, now Oklahoma.
Choctaw of Louisiana, Alabama, and Oklahoma.
Chickasaw of Tennessee, now Oklahoma.
Indigenous peoples of Florida
Indigenous people of the Everglades region
Calusa of South Florida.
Tequesta of South Florida.
Timucua of Northern Florida and Southern Georgia.
Apalachee of the Florida Panhandle and Alabama.
Seminole of Oklahoma, and Florida.
Siouans
Ho-Chunk of Wisconsin and Michigan.
Catawba of North Carolina.
Pee Dee of South Carolina.
Caddoans
Caddo of Texas, Arkansas, and Louisiana.
Pawnee of Oklahoma, Nebraska and Kansas, United States.
Southern Plains villagers of Western Oklahoma, Texas, Kansas, and Southeastern Colorado.
Arikara of North Dakota, United States.
Hidatsa of North Dakota, United States.
Wichita of Oklahoma, Kansas, and Texas, United States.

Southwest 

Uto-Aztecan peoples
Aztecan (Nahuan) peoples
Mexicanero (Mēxihcah): Durango, Mexico
Cáhitan peoples
Yaqui (Hiaki/Yoeme): Sonora, Mexico, and Arizona, United States.
Mayo (Yoreme): Sonora, Mexico
Tarahumaran peoples
Guarijío: Sonora, Mexico
Tarahumara (Rarámuri-Omugí): Chihuahua and Durango, Mexico
Tepiman peoples
Pima Bajo: Chihuahua, Mexico
Tepehuán (O'dam/Audam/Ódami): Chihuahua and Durango, Mexico
Seri (Comcaac): Sonora, Mexico
Puebloan peoples: Colorado, New Mexico, Arizona, Utah, and Texas, United States
Hopi of New Mexico, United States.
Zuni of Arizona, United States.
Anasazi of New Mexico and Colorado, United States.
Tiwa of New Mexico, United States.
Mogollon of New Mexico, Arizona, United States, and Sonora, Mexico.
Hohokam of Southern Arizona, United States.
Southern Athabascans
Apache of Chihuahua, Coahuilla, and Sonora, Mexico, as well as Arizona, New Mexico, Oklahoma, and Texas, United States.
Chiricahua of Southern New Mexico, Northern Mexico, and Southeast Arizona.
Lipan Apache of Northern Texas, and Western Oklahoma.
Plains Apache of Oklahoma.
Mescalero of Arizona, New Mexico, and Northern Chihuahua.
Western Apache of Western Arizona.
Navajo of the Four Corners region.
O'odham of Sonora, Mexico, and Arizona, United States.
Pima of Arizona, United States.
Papago of far Northern Sonora, Mexico, and Southern Arizona, United States.

Mesoamerica 

Huave (Ikoots/Kunajts): Oaxaca, Mexico
Lenca: Honduras and El Salvador
Maya peoples
Ch'olan peoples
Ch'ol: Chiapas, Mexico
Ch'orti': El Salvador
Chontal Maya (Yokot'anob/Yokot'an): Tabasco, Mexico
Tzeltal (Winik Atel/Batzilʼop): Chiapas, Mexico
Tzotzil (Bats'ik'op/Sotz'leb): Chiapas, Mexico
Huastec (Téenek/Te' Inik): San Luis Potosí, Mexico
Mamean peoples
Ixil: Guatemala
Mam: Guatemala
Q'anjobalan peoples
Chuj: Guatemala
Jakaltek: Guatemala – also called Poptí
Q'anjob'al: Guatemala
Tojolabal: Guatemala
Qichean peoples
Achi': Guatemala
Kaqchikel: Guatemala
K'iche': Guatemala
Poqomchi': Guatemala
Poqomam: Guatemala
Q'eqchi': Guatemala
Tz'utujil: Guatemala
Yucatecan peoples
Itza: Guatemala
Lacandón (Hach Winik): Chiapas, Mexico
Mopan: Guatemala and Belize
Yucatec Maya (Maya proper) (Màaya): Yucatán, Quintana Roo and Campeche, Mexico
Mixe-Zoquean peoples
Mixe (Ayüükjä'äy): Oaxaca, Mexico
Zoque: Oaxaca and Chiapas Mexico
Oto-Manguean peoples
Amuzgo (Tzjon Non/Tzo'tyio/Ñ'anncue): Oaxaca, Mexico
Chinantec: Oaxaca, Mexico
Manguean
Chorotega (Mangue/Mankeme): Honduras, Nicaragua, and Costa Rica
Mixtecan
Cuicatec:Oaxaca, Mexico
Mixtec (Ñuù Savi/Nayívi Savi/Ñuù Davi/Nayivi Davi): Oaxaca, Mexico
Trique: Oaxaca, Mexico
Oto-Pamean peoples
Chichimeca Jonaz (Úza): San Luis Potosí, Mexico
Matlatzinca: Mexico (state), Mexico
Mazahua (Tetjo Ñaa Jñatjo): Mexico (state), Mexico
Otomi (Hñähñu/Hñähño/Ñuhu/Ñhato/Ñuhmu): Central Mexico, Mexico
Pame (Xi'úi): San Luis Potosí, Mexico
Popolocan peoples
Chocho (Ngiwa): Oaxaca, Mexico
Ixcatec: Oaxaca, Mexico
Popoloca: Oaxaca, and Puebla, Mexico
Mazatec (Ha Shuta Enima): Puebla and Oaxaca, Mexico
Tlapanec (Me'phaa): Guerrero, Mexico
Zapotecan peoples
Chatino (Kitse Cha'tño): Oaxaca, Mexico
Zapotec (Be'ena'a/Didxažon): Oaxaca, Mexico
Tarascan (P'urhépecha): Michoacán, Mexico
Tequistlatecan/Chontal de Oaxaca: Oaxaca, Mexico
Totonacan peoples
Totonac (Tutunacu): Veracruz and Puebla, Mexico
Uto-Aztecan peoples
Aztecan peoples
Nahua (Nāhuatlācah): Mexico
Corachol peoples
Cora (Náayarite): Jalisco and Nayarit, Mexico
Huichol (Wixáritari/Wixárita): Jalisco and Nayarit, Mexico
Xinca (Xinka): Guatemala

Circum-Caribbean 

Chibchan peoples
Boruca: Costa Rica
Bribri: Costa Rica
Cabécar: Costa Rica
Naso/Teribe/Tjër Di: Costa Rica, Panama
Guaymi/Waimi peoples
Bokota: Panama
Ngäbe–Buglé: Panama, Costa Rica
Talamanca peoplesl
Kuna (Dule/Tule): Panama
Pech: Honduras
Votic peoples
Maleku: Costa Rica
Rama: Nicaragua
Chocó/Embera-Wounaan peoples
Emberá/Chocó proper (ɛ̃berá): Panama
Misumalpan peoples
Miskito (Miskitu): Honduras and Nicaragua
Tawira Miskito (Tawira Miskitu) 
Sumalpan peoples
Sumo (Mayangna): Nicaragua
Tolupan/Jicaque: Honduras
Zambo/Cafuso peoples (mixed West African and Amerindian peoples)
Garífuna: A mixed West African (from several peoples) and Amerindian people (mainly from the Island Caribs - Kalhíphona) that traditionally speaks an Arawakan language in Belize and Honduras.
Miskito Sambu: A mixed West African (from several peoples) and Amerindian people (mainly from the original Miskito) that traditionally speaks Miskito, a Misumalpan language, and also Nicaragua Creole English in Nicaragua and Honduras.
Black Seminoles: Florida, The Bahamas, and Mexico. (Mixed Seminole and African).

West Indies 

The West Indies, or the Caribbean, generally includes the island chains of the Caribbean Sea.
Arawakan peoples
Northern
Circum-Caribbean/Ta-Arawakan peoples
Eyeri/Igneri: Lesser Antilles. An Arawak people, may have been the Kalinago/Island Caribs before caribbeanization. (The Island Caribs had the tradition that the Igneri were the older people of Lesser Antilles but they could have been ancestors of the majority of Island Caribs).
Island Caribs (Carib/Kalinago/Kalhíphona): Lesser Antilles. Often called "Island Caribs" (but may have been an older arawak people with a carib conquering warrior elite or influenced by Mainland Caribs. Apparently, the majority of the people spoke an arawakan language and not a carib one.)
Taíno: Amerindians who originally inhabited the Greater Antilles of the Caribbean, they are of Arawakan descent.
Neo-Taíno nations Some scholars distinguish between the Taíno and Neo-Taíno groups. Neo-Taíno groups were also native to the Antilles islands, but had distinctive languages and cultural practices that differed from the High Taíno. These groups include:
Ciboney: a term preferred in Cuban historical texts for the neo-Taino-Siboney nations of the island of Cuba.
Ciguayo: Eastern Hispaniola
Lucayans: Based in the Bahamas.
Macorix: Hispaniola.
Guanahatabey people: Western Cuba island, a Pre-Arawakan and Pre-Island Carib people of the Caribbean Islands.

South America 

South America generally includes all of the continent and islands south of the Isthmus of Panama.

Indigenous peoples in South America by Country:
Indigenous peoples in Argentina
List of indigenous peoples of Brazil
Indigenous peoples in Chile
Indigenous peoples in Colombia
Indigenous peoples in Ecuador
Indigenous peoples in Peru
Indigenous peoples in South America by native cultural regions

Circum-Caribbean (Chibcha) 

Arawakan peoples
Northern
Ta-Arawakan
Wayuu: Venezuela/Colombia
Chibchan peoples
Chibcha–Motilon
Chibcha–Tunebo
U'wa: Colombia
Kuna–Colombian
Kuna (Dule/Tule): Panama
Chocoan peoples
Embera (ɛ̃berá): Colombia/Panamá
Warao: Venezuela's Orinoco River delta region.

Amazon 

Arawakan peoples
Southern
Campa
Asháninka: Peru
Barbacoan peoples
Awan
Awá-Kwaiker: Northern Ecuador
Bora-Witoto peoples
Bora: Colombia/Peru
Cahuapanan peoples
Chayahuita: Loreto, Peru
Jivaroan (Shuar): Loreto and San Martín, Peru
Nukak: Colombia
Panoan peoples
Mainline Panoan
Nawa
Chama
Shipibo-Conibo people: Ucayali, Peru
Shipibo: Ucayali, Peru
Headwaters
Yora: Amazon rainforest, southeast Peru
Mayoruna
Mayo
Korubu (Dslala): Brazil
Matis: Brazil/Peru
Matsés: Brazil/Peru
Pirahã: Brazil
Ticuna-Yuri peoples
Ticuna (Tikuna): Brazil/Peru/Colombia
Tucanoan peoples
Eastern
North
Tukano: Colombia
Western
Napo
Siona–Secoya
Secoya: Loreto, Peru/Ecuador
Tupian peoples
Tupí-Guaraní
Tupi: Paraguay, Brazil, Bolivia, Peru and Argentina
Cocama-Omagua
Cocama-Cocamilla (Kokáma): Loreto, Peru
Tapirape: Brazil
Wayampí
Guajá
Awá-Guajá: eastern Amazonian rainforest, Brazil
Urarina (Kachá): Chambira Basin, Loreto Peru
Yanomami (Yanõmami/Yanõmami Thëpë): Venezuela/Brazil

Guianas 

Cariban peoples
Galibi/Kalina (Mainland Caribs): Guianas, Venezuela (northern coast of South America)
Yekuana
Eñapa (Panare)
Pemóng
Pemóng
Makuxi: Brazil, Guyana
Yanomami (Yanõmami/Yanõmami Thëpë): Venezuela/Brazil
Piaroa (Wothïha): Venezuela/Colombia

Eastern Highlands (Brazilian Highlands) 

Charruan peoples
Charrúa: Uruguay, Brazil and Argentina
Macro-Gê peoples
Bororoan
Bororo: Mato Grosso, Brazil
Ofaie
Karajá/Iny: Brazil
Tupian peoples
Tupí-Guaraní
Guaraní (I)
Ache: Paraguay
Pai Tavytera: Paraguay
Guaraní
Guaraní (Abá/Avá): Paraguay, Uruguay, Brazil, Bolivia and Argentina
Tupi: Paraguay, Brazil, Bolivia, Peru and Argentina
Cocama-Omagua
Cocama-Cocamilla (Kokáma): Loreto, Peru
Tapirape: Brazil
Wayampí
Guajá
Awá-Guajá: eastern Amazonian rainforest, Brazil

Chaco 

Mascoian peoples
Enxet: Paraguay
Matacoan peoples
Wichí: the Chaco, Argentina/Bolivia
Zamucoan peoples
Ayoreo: the Chaco, Paraguay/Bolivia

Central Andes 

Aymaran peoples
Aymara: Peru/Bolivia/Chile
Nasa: Colombia
Quechuan peoples
Quechua (Nunakuna/Runakuna/Kichwa/Inga)

Southern Cone

Araucania 
Araucanian peoples
Mapuche (Araucanians): Chile/Argentina
Mapuche-Huilliche
Pehuenche

Patagonia 
Chono: Chiloé, Guaitecas and Chonos
Tehuelche: Southern Chile/Argentina

Tierra del Fuego 
Alacalufe (Kawésqar): Far Southern Chile
Selk'nam: Southern Argentina and Chile
Yaghan (Yámana): Far Southern Chile
Haush: Far Southern Argentina

Oceania 
Oceania includes most islands of the Pacific Ocean, New Guinea, New Zealand and the continent of Australia.

List of peoples by geographical and ethnolinguistic grouping:

Australia 

Indigenous Australians include Aboriginal Australians on the mainland and Tiwi Islands as well as Torres Strait Islander peoples from the Torres Strait Islands.
Aboriginal Australians include hundreds of groupings of people, defined by various overlapping characteristics such as language, culture and geography, which may include sub-groups. The Indigenous peoples of the island state of Tasmania and the Tiwi people (of the Tiwi Islands off the Northern Territory) are also Aboriginal peoples, who are genetically and culturally distinct from Torres Strait Islander peoples.
Torres Strait Islander peoples are culturally and linguistically Papuo-Austronesian, and the various peoples of the islands are of predominantly Melanesian descent. The Torres Strait Islands are part of the state of Queensland.

Western Desert 

Pama-Nyungan peoples
Kunapa: Northern Territory, Australia
Pini: Western Australia, Australia
Spinifex: Western Australia, Australia
Wangkatha: Western Australia, Australia
Warumungu: Northern Territory, Australia
Wati peoples
Antakirinja: South Australia, Australia
Kokatha: South Australia, Australia
Luritja: Northern Territory, Australia
Madoidja: Western Australia, Australia
Maduwongga: Western Australia, Australia
Martu peoples
Kartudjara: Western Australia, Australia
Keiadjara: Western Australia, Australia
Mandjildjara: Western Australia, Australia
Putidjara: Western Australia, Australia
Wanman: Western Australia, Australia
Marrngu peoples
Karajarri: Great Sandy Desert, Western Australia, Australia
Mangarla: Great Sandy Desert, Western Australia, Australia
Nyangumarta: Great Sandy Desert, Western Australia, Australia
Ngaanyatjarra: Northern Territory, Australia
Ngaatjatjarra: Western Australia, Australia
Pintupi: Western Australia, Australia
Pitjantjatjara: Northern Territory, Australia
Wangkatjunga: Western Australia, Australia
Yankunytjatjara: South Australia, Australia
Yulparirra: Western Australia, Australia
Yumu: Northern Territory, Australia
Yankuntjatjarra: South Australia, Australia
Mirindi peoples
Ngurlun peoples
Ngarnka: Northern Territory, Australia
Wambaya: Northern Territory, Australia

Kimberley 

Bunuban peoples
Bunuba: Fitzroy Crossing, Western Australia, Australia
Gooniyandi: Fitzroy Crossing, Western Australia, Australia
Jarrakan peoples
Gija: Halls Creek and Kununurra, Western Australia, Australia
Miriwoongic peoples
Miriwoong: Kunurra, Western Australia, Australia
Gajirrawoong: Eastern Kimberley and Northern Territory, Australia
Nyulnyulan peoples
Nyulnyulic peoples
Bardi: Dampier Peninsula, Western Australia, Australia
Jabirr Jabirr: Dampier Peninsula, Western Australia, Australia
Jawi: Dampier Peninsula, Western Australia, Australia
Nimanburru: Dampier Peninsula, Western Australia, Australia
Nyulnyul: Dampier Peninsula, Western Australia, Australia
Dyukun peoples
Jugun: Dampier Peninsula, Western Australia, Australia
Ngombal: Dampier Peninsula, Western Australia, Australia
Nyigina: Dampier Peninsula, Western Australia, Australia
Warrwa: Dampier Peninsula, Western Australia, Australia
Yawuru: Dampier Peninsula, Western Australia, Australia
Worrorran peoples
Ngarinyin: Western Australia, Australia
Worrorra: Western Australia, Australia
Wunambal: Western Australia, Australia

Northwest 

Pama-Nyungan peoples
Ngayarda peoples
Bailgu: Pilbara region, Western Australia, Australia
Inawongga: Pilbara region, Western Australia, Australia
Jadira: Pilbara region, Western Australia, Australia
Kurrama: Pilbara region, Western Australia, Australia
Mardudunera: Pilbara region, Western Australia, Australia
Ngarla: Pilbara region, Western Australia, Australia
Ngarluma: Pilbara region, Western Australia, Australia
Niabali: Pilbara region, Western Australia, Australia
Nhuwala: Pilbara region, Western Australia, Australia
Nyamal: Pilbara region, Western Australia, Australia
Panyjima: Pilbara region, Western Australia, Australia
Tjuroro: Pilbara region, Western Australia, Australia
Kanyara-Mantharta peoples
Kanyara peoples
Baiyungu: Gascoyne region, Western Australia, Australia
Binigura: Pilbara region, Western Australia, Australia
Buruna: Mid West region, Western Australia, Australia
Thalanyji: Pilbara region, Western Australia, Australia
Yinikutira: Exmouth, Western Australia, Australia
Mantharta peoples
Djiwali: Pilbara region, Western Australia, Australia
Tharrkari: Gascoyne region, Western Australia, Australia
Tenma: Pilbara region, Western Australia, Australia
Warriyangga: Gascoyne region, Western Australia, Australia
Kartu peoples
Badimaya: Mid West region, Western Australia, Australia
Maia: Mid West region, Western Australia, Australia
Malgana: Mid West region, Western Australia, Australia
Nanda: Mid West region, Western Australia, Australia
Nokaan: Mid West region, Western Australia, Australia
Wajarri: Mid West region, Western Australia, Australia
Widi: Mid West region, Western Australia, Australia
Yingkarta: Gascoyne region, Western Australia, Australia

Southwest 

Pama-Nyungan peoples
Nyungic peoples
Noongar peoples
Amangu: Geraldton Sandplains, Western Australia, Australia
Ballardong: Avon Wheatbelt, Western Australia, Australia
Yued: Swan Coastal Plain, Western Australia, Australia
Kaneang: Jarrah Forest, Western Australia, Australia
Koreng: Mallee, Western Australia, Australia
Mineng: Warren, Western Australia, Australia
Njakinjaki: Avon Wheatbelt, Western Australia, Australia
Njunga: Esperance Plains, Western Australia, Australia
Bibulman: Warren, Western Australia, Australia
Pindjarup: Jarrah Forest, Western Australia, Australia
Warandi: Swan Coastal Plain, Western Australia, Australia
Whadjuk: Jarrah Forest, Western Australia, Australia
Wiilman: Western Australia, Australia
Wudjari: Mallee, Western Australia, Australia
Kalaako: Goldfields–Esperance region, Western Australia, Australia
Kalamaia: Western Australia, Australia
Mirning peoples
Mirning: Western Australia and South Australia, Australia
Ngadjumaya: Goldfields–Esperance region, Western Australia, Australia
Yingkarta: Gascoyne region, Western Australia, Australia

Fitzmaurice Basin 

Yirram peoples
Nungali: Northern Territory, Australia
Jaminjung: Northern Territory, Australia
Macro-Gunwinyguan peoples
Kungarakany: Northern Territory, Australia
Warrayic peoples
Awarai: Northern Territory, Australia
Awinmul: Northern Territory, Australia
Wulwulam: Northern Territory, Australia
Daly peoples
Wagaydic peoples
Wadjiginy: Anson Bay, Northern Territory, Australia
Mulluk-Mulluk: Northern Territory, Australia
Western Daly peoples
Emmiyangal: Anson Bay, Northern Territory, Australia
Marranunggu: Daly River, Northern Territory, Australia
Menthe: Northern Territory, Australia
Marrithiyal: Daly River, Northern Territory, Australia
Maramanindji: Northern Territory, Australia
Marridan: Northern Territory, Australia
Marri Amu: Northern Territory, Australia
Marri Tjevin: Northern Territory, Australia
Marijedi: Northern Territory, Australia
Marri Ngarr: Moyle River, Northern Territory, Australia
Mati Ke: Wadeye, Northern Territory, Australia
Eastern Daly peoples
Madngela: Northern Territory, Australia
Yunggor: Northern Territory, Australia
Southern Daly peoples
Murrinh-Patha: Wadeye, Northern Territory, Australia
Muringura people: Fitzmaurice River, Northern Territory, Australia
Ngan'gimerri: Daly River, Northern Territory, Australia

Arnhem Land 

Pama-Nyungan peoples
Yolngu: Northern Territory, Australia
Macro-Gunwinyguan peoples
Maningrida peoples
Burarra: Maningrida, Northern Territory, Australia
Gadjalivia: Blyth River, Northern Territory, Australia
Gunavidji: Maningrida, Northern Territory, Australia
Gurr-Goni: Maningrida, Northern Territory, Australia
Nagara: Blyth River, Northern Territory, Australia
East Arnhem peoples
Anindilyakwa: Northern Territory, Australia
Ngandi: Northern Territory, Australia
Nunggubuyu: Northern Territory, Australia
Marran peoples
Alawa: Northern Territory, Australia
Mangarayi: Northern Territory, Australia
Marra: Northern Territory, Australia
Warndarrang: Northern Territory, Australia
Yukul: Northern Territory, Australia
Gaagudju: Northern Territory, Australia
Gunwinyguan peoples
Gunwinggic peoples
Bininj: Northern Territory, Australia
Gambalang: Northern Territory, Australia
Dalabon: Northern Territory, Australia
Jawoyn: Nitmiluk National Park, Northern Territory, Australia
Jala peoples
Ngalakgan: Northern Territory, Australia
Rembarrnga: Northern Territory, Australia
Iwaidjan peoples
Amurdak: Cobourg Peninsula, Northern Territory, Australia
Iwaidjic peoples
Maung: Goulburn Islands, Northern Territory, Australia
Warrkbi
Gaari: Cobourg Peninsula, Northern Territory, Australia
Iwaidja: Cobourg Peninsula, Northern Territory, Australia
Marrku-Wurrugu peoples
Wurango: Cobourg Peninsula, Northern Territory, Australia
Yaako: Croker Island, Northern Territory, Australia

Top End 

Tiwi: Tiwi Islands, Northern Territory, Australia
Darwin Region peoples
Larrakia: Darwin, Northern Territory, Australia
Limilngan
Puneitja: Northern Territory, Australia
Beriguruk: Northern Territory, Australia
Djerimanga: Northern Territory, Australia
Umbugarlic peoples
Ngomburr: Alligator Rivers, Northern Territory, Australia
Giimbiyu: Alligator Rivers, Northern Territory, Australia

Gulf Country 

Pama-Nyungan peoples
Mayabic peoples
Mayi-Kutuna: Queensland, Australia
Marrago: Queensland, Australia
Maikulan: Queensland, Australia
Maithakari: Queensland, Australia
Maijabi: Queensland, Australia
Ngaun: Queensland, Australia
Wanamara: Queensland, Australia
Paman peoples
Southwestern Paman peoples
Agwamin: Queensland, Australia
Kok-Nar: Queensland, Australia
Mbara: Queensland, Australia
Yanga: Queensland, Australia
Tankgkic peoples
Lardil: Mornington Island, Wellesley Islands, Queensland, Australia
Kaiadilt: Wellesley Islands, Queensland, Australia
Yukulta: Queensland, Australia
Nguburinji: Queensland, Australia
Mingin: Queensland, Australia
Garawan peoples
Garrwa: Northern Territory and Queensland, Australia
Waanyi: Queensland, Australia

Cape York

West Cape 

Pama-Nyungan peoples
Paman peoples
North Cape York Paman peoples
Djagaraga: Cape York Peninsula, Queensland, Australia
Tjungundji: Cape York Peninsula, Queensland, Australia
Injinoo: Cape York Peninsula, Queensland, Australia
Luthigh: Cape York Peninsula, Queensland, Australia
Mbewum: Cape York Peninsula, Queensland, Australia
Tjungundji: Cape York Peninsula, Queensland, Australia
Totj: Cape York Peninsula, Queensland, Australia
Unduyamo: Cape York Peninsula, Queensland, Australia
Wik peoples
Wik-Mungkan: Cape York Peninsula, Queensland, Australia
Kugu Nganhcara: Cape York Peninsula, Queensland, Australia
Wiknatanja: Cape York Peninsula, Queensland, Australia
Wik Me'anh: Cape York Peninsula, Queensland, Australia
Wik Epa: Cape York Peninsula, Queensland, Australia
Wik Elken: Cape York Peninsula, Queensland, Australia
Wik Paach: Cape York Peninsula, Queensland, Australia
Wik Ompom: Cape York Peninsula, Queensland, Australia
Wimaranga: Cape York Peninsula, Queensland, Australia
Winduwinda: Cape York Peninsula, Queensland, Australia
Thaypan peoples
Tagalag: Cape York Peninsula, Queensland, Australia

East Cape 

Pama-Nyungan peoples
Paman peoples
North Cape York Paman peoples
Yadhaykenu: Cape York Peninsula, Queensland, Australia
Wuthathi: Cape York Peninsula, Queensland, Australia
Kaantju, Coen, Queensland, Australia
Pakadji: Cape York Peninsula, Queensland, Australia
Uutaalnganu: Cape York Peninsula, Queensland, Australia
Lamalamic peoples
Lama Lama: Cape York Peninsula, Queensland, Australia
Northeast Paman peoples
Umpila: Cape York Peninsula, Queensland, Australia

Daintree Rainforest 

Pama-Nyungan peoples
Paman peoples
Djabugay: Queensland, Australia
Yidiny: Queensland, Australia
Mbabaram: Atherton Tableland, Queensland, Australia
Dyirbalic peoples
Dyirbal: Atherton Tableland, Queensland, Australia
Warrgamay: Queensland, Australia
Nyawigi: Halifax Bay, Queensland, Australia

Lake Eyre Basin 

Pama-Nyungan peoples
Kalkatungic peoples
Kalkatungu: Queensland, Australia
Yalarnnga: Queensland, Australia
Karnic peoples
Arabana: South Australia, Australia
Wangkangurru: Simpson Desert, South Australia, Australia
Pitapita: Queensland, Australia
Yandruwandha: South Australia, Australia
Yawarrawarrka: South Australia, Australia
Mitaka: Queensland, Australia
Wanggumara: Queensland, Australia
Yarli peoples
Karenggapa: New South Wales, Australia

Spencer Gulf 

Pama-Nyungan peoples
Thura-Yura peoples
Wirangu: South Australia, Australia
Nauo: Eyre Peninsula, South Australia, Australia
Barngarla: Eyre Peninsula, South Australia, Australia
Kuyani: South Australia, Australia
Adnyamathanha: Flinders Ranges, South Australia, Australia
Malyangapa: New South Wales, Australia
Ngadjuri: South Australia, Australia
Nukunu: South Australia, Australia
Narungga: Yorke Peninsula, South Australia, Australia
Kaurna: Adelaide Plains, South Australia, Australia
Peramangk: Adelaide Plains, South Australia, Australia

Murray-Darling Basin 

Pama-Nyungan peoples
Yotayotic peoples
Yorta Yorta: New South Wales and Victoria, Australia
Ngarrimouro: New South Wales and Victoria, Australia
Lower Murray peoples
Ngarrindjeri: South Australia, Australia
Ngaiawang: South Australia, Australia
Yuyu peoples
Ngawait: Murray River, South Australia, Australia
Erawirung: Riverland, South Australia, Australia
Ngintait: South Australia and Victoria, Australia
Ngarkat: South Australia, Australia
Kureinji: New South Wales, Australia
Jitajita: New South Wales, Australia
Tatitati: Murray River, Victoria, Australia
Wiradhuric peoples
Gamilaraay: New South Wales and Queensland, Australia
Wiradjuri: New South Wales, Australia
Ngiyampaa: New South Wales, Australia
Muruwari: New South Wales and Queensland, Australia

Northeast 

Pama-Nyungan peoples
Lower Burdekin peoples
Juru: Queensland, Australia
Bindal: Queensland, Australia
Maric peoples
Biri peoples
Gugu-Badhun: Burdekin River, Queensland, Australia
Yilba: Mackay, Queensland, Australia
Gia: Queensland, Australia
Biria: Queensland, Australia
Yambina: Queensland, Australia
Garaynbal: Queensland, Australia
Yangga: Queensland, Australia
Baranha: Queensland, Australia
Miyan: Queensland, Australia
Yuwibara: Queensland, Australia
Kingkel peoples
Darumbal: Queensland, Australia
Guwinmal: Queensland, Australia
Waka-Kabic peoples
Goreng Goreng: Queensland, Australia
Wulli Wulli: Queensland, Australia
Wakka Wakka: Queensland, Australia
Baruŋgam: Queensland, Australia
Gubbi Gubbi: Queensland, Australia
Butchulla: Fraser Island, Queensland, Australia
Jagera: Queensland, Australia

Southeast 

Pama-Nyungan peoples
Yugambeh-Bundjalung peoples
Bundjalung: New South Wales, Australia
Ngarbal: New South Wales, Australia
Gumbaynggiric peoples
Gumbaynggirr: Mid North Coast, New South Wales, Australia
Yaygirr: Coffs Harbour, New South Wales, Australia
Anēwan: Northern Tablelands, New South Wales, Australia
Yuin-Kuric peoples
Djangadi: Macleay Valley, New South Wales, Australia
Geawegal: Hunter Valley, New South Wales, Australia
Worimi: New South Wales, Australia
Wonnarua: New South Wales, Australia
Awabakal: New South Wales, Australia
Eora: New South Wales, Australia
Darug: New South Wales, Australia
Gandangara: New South Wales, Australia
Tharawal: Sydney, New South Wales, Australia
Ngarigo: New South Wales and Victoria, Australia
Koori: New South Wales and Victoria, Australia
Gippsland peoples
Gunai: Gippsland, Victoria, Australia
Bidawal: Gippsland, Victoria, Australia
Dhudhuroa: Victoria, Australia
Kulinic peoples
Kulin peoples
Wurundjeri: Yarra River, Victoria, Australia
Boonwurrung: Werribee River, Victoria, Australia
Wathaurong: Victoria, Australia
Taungurung: Victoria, Australia
Djadjawurrung: Victoria, Australia
Drual peoples
Bungandidj: Mount Gambier, South Australia, Australia
Gunditjmara: Victoria, Australia
Gulidjan: Lake Colac, Victoria, Australia

Tasmania 

Palawa peoples
Western Tasmanian peoples
Peerapper: Circular Head and Robbins Island, Tasmania, Australia
Toogee: Macquarie Harbour, Tasmania, Australia
Northern Tasmanian peoples
Tommeginne: Northern Tasmania, Australia
Northeastern Tasmanian peoples
Pyemmairre: Northeastern Tasmania, Australia
Tyerrernotepanner: Northern Midlands and Ben Lomond, Tasmania, Australia
Eastern Tasmanian peoples
Paredarerme: Oyster Bay, Tasmania, Australia
Lairmairrener: Big River, Tasmania, Australia
Nuennone: Bruny Island, Tasmania, Australia

Torres Strait Islands 

Torres Strait Islanders
Badu: Badu Island, Torres Strait Islands, Queensland, Australia
Kaurareg: Central Torres Strait Islands, Queensland, Australia
Mabuiag: Torres Strait Islands, Queensland, Australia
Meriam: Eastern Torres Strait Islands, Queensland, Australia

Melanesia 

Melanesia generally includes New Guinea and other (far-)western Pacific islands from the Arafura Sea out to Fiji. The region is mostly inhabited by the Melanesian peoples.
Melanesians
Austronesian speaking Melanesians
Fijians (iTaukei): Fiji
Kanak: New-Caledonia
Malaitan people: Malaita, Solomon Islands
Ni-Vanuatu: Vanuatu
Papuan speaking Melanesians
Baining
Papuans: more than 250 distinct tribes or clans, each with their own language and culture. The main island of New Guinea and surrounding islands (territory forming independent state of Papua New Guinea (PNG) and the Indonesian provinces of West Papua and Papua). Considered "Indigenous" these people are a subject to many debates.
Sepik peoples
Kwoma: Peilungua Mountains, Papua New Guinea.
Iatmul: Sepik, Papua New Guinea.
Sepik Hill
Sanio
Hewa: Southern Highlands, PNG
Trans New-Guinean peoples
Huli of the Southern Highlands, Papua New Guinea.
Angu: Southwestern Morobe Province, Papua New Guinea.
Bosavi
Kaluli-Kasua
Kaluli: Great Papuan Plateau, PNG
Ok
Mountain Ok
Wopkaimin: western PNG, Star Mountains.
West Trans New-Guinean peoples
Dani: Papua, Indonesia
Korowai: West Papua, close to the Papua New Guinea border.
Asmat: Asmat Regency, West Papua.

Micronesia 
Micronesia generally includes the various small island chains of the western and central Pacific. The region is mostly inhabited by the Micronesian peoples.
Micronesians
Chamorro people: Northern Marianas and Guam
Carolinians: Northern Marianas
 Yapese, Kosraeans, Chuukese, Pohnpeians, Palauans, Kiribati's

Polynesia 

Polynesia includes New Zealand and the islands of Oceania, and has various Indigenous populations.

Polynesians
Native Hawaiians
Tongans
Tuvaluan people
Marquesas Islanders
Rapanui
Samoans
Tokelau
Austral Islanders
Cook Islanders
Maohi, Tahiti
Māori, New Zealand
Moriori, Chatham Islands
Tahitians, French Polynesia
Tuamotus
Niueans

Polynesian outliers
Vanuatuans
Kapingamarangi and Nukuoro, The Federated States of Micronesia
Rennel, Tikopia and Vaeakau-Taumako, Solomon Islands
Nuguria, Papua New Guinea
Nukumanu, Papua New Guinea
Takuu, Papua New Guinea
Ontong Java
Sikaiana
Anuta, Solomon Islands
Fagauvea, Ouvéa, New Caledonia
Aniwa
Bellona
Rennel

Circumpolar 
Circumpolar peoples is an umbrella term for the various Indigenous peoples of the Arctic.
List of peoples by ethnolinguistic grouping:  
"Paleosiberian"
Chukotko-Kamchatkan
Chukchi (Lyg'oravetl'et/O'ravetl'et): Siberia, Russian Far East, Russia
Koryaks (Nymylan-Chauchuven): Russian Far East
Tungusic
Evenks (Evenkil): China, Mongolia, Russia
Eskimo–Aleut
Aleut (Unangax): Aleutian Islands and Kamchatka Krai
Eskimo/Yupik-Inuit
Yupik: Alaska, United States and the Russian Far East, Siberia
Alutiiq (Sugpiat): Alaska, United States
Yup'ik (Yupiat/Yupiit/Cup'ik/Cupiit): Alaska, United States
Cup'ig (Nunivak Cup'ig people): Nunivak Island (Alaska), United States
Siberian Yupik (Yupighyt): Siberia, Russia
Inuit: Greenland, Northern Canada (Nunavut, Nunavik and Northwest Territories), Alaska, United States
Inupiat (Iñupiat): Alaska's Arctic and North Slope boroughs and the Bering Straits
Kalaallit (Kalaallit): Greenland
Turkic
Northeast Turks
Dolgans (Dolgan/Tya Kikhi): Siberia (Krasnoyarsk Krai), Russia
Yakuts (Sakha): Siberia (Sakha Republic), Russia
Ugrians, Yugra, Siberia, Russia
Khanty (Kantek/Khanti): Yugra, Siberia, Russia
Mansi, formerly known as Voguls: Yugra, Siberia, Russia
Sami (Sámi/Saami/Lapp), formerly known by the exonym Lapps: Northern Norway, Sweden, Finland, and Kola Peninsula in Russia
Samoyedic peoples
Northern Samoyedic peoples: West Siberia and Far Northern European Russia
Enets (Entsi): Far Northern Western Siberia, Russia
Nenets (Neney Neneche): Far Northern Western Siberia and Far Northern European Russia
Nganasan (Ŋənəhsa(nəh)): Taymyr Peninsula, Siberia, Russia
Yukaghirs (Odul/Vadul/Detkil'): Far Northern East Siberia, Russia

See also 

Center for World Indigenous Studies
Declaration on the Rights of Indigenous Peoples
Indigenous peoples
Indigenous archaeology
Indigenous Dialogues
Indigenous (ecology)
Indigenous intellectual property
Indigenous knowledge
Indigenous language
Indigenous medicine
Indigenous music
International Work Group for Indigenous Affairs
United Nations Permanent Forum on Indigenous Issues
World Council of Indigenous Peoples
Working Group on Indigenous Populations
List of contemporary ethnic groups
Lists of people by nationality
List of indigenous rights organizations
See all pages that start with indigenous people or indigenous

References

Notes

Citations

Sources

 
 
 
 

List
Indigenous